Anthenagin is an album by drummer Art Blakey and The Jazz Messengers recorded in 1973 and released on the Prestige label.

Reception

Allmusic awarded the album 4½ stars stating "Despite Walton's occasional electric keyboards, this date returns to the feel of the earlier Jazz Messengers recordings".

Track listing 
All compositions by Cedar Walton except where noted.
 "I'm Not So Sure" – 7:07   
 "Love: For the One You Can't Have" (Woody Shaw) – 6:23   
 "Fantasy in D" – 8:38   
 "Anthenagin" – 11:56   
 "Without a Song" (Vincent Youmans, Billy Rose, Edward Eliscu) – 5:35   
 "Along Came Betty" (Benny Golson) – 6:06

Personnel 
Art Blakey – drums
Woody Shaw – trumpet
Steve Turre – trombone (tracks 2 & 3)
Carter Jefferson – tenor saxophone, soprano saxophone
Cedar Walton – piano, electric piano
Michael Howell – guitar (track 6)
Mickey Bass – bass
Tony Waters – congas

References 

Art Blakey albums
The Jazz Messengers albums
1973 albums
Prestige Records albums
Albums produced by Orrin Keepnews